Bruno Da Col (25 February 1913 – 29 July 1995) was an Italian ski jumper. He competed at the 1936 Winter Olympics and the 1948 Winter Olympics. In the town of Ponte di Legno, Da Col completed the first ski jump over 100 meters in Italy. He later received a medal of honor for his achievements from Benito Mussolini.

References

External links
 

1913 births
1995 deaths
Italian male ski jumpers
Olympic ski jumpers of Italy
Ski jumpers at the 1936 Winter Olympics
Ski jumpers at the 1948 Winter Olympics
Place of birth missing